A Grotto is an internal organization of the National Speleological Society (NSS). They generally function as the local NSS chapter/club. Many Grottos however, operate in areas outside of their local area, with many operating in several states. Most Grottos also participate in Regions which are loose associations of Grottos. Regions are also an internal organization of the National Speleological Society.

Organization 
Grottos are required to meet certain organizational requirements as outlined by the National Speleological Society. These include:
 A constitution and bylaws that are submitted to, and approved by, the NSS
 A minimum of at least five members of the Society
 It is NSS policy that full membership in a Grotto requires NSS membership. However, in practice, this is often not the case.

An annual report describing various aspects of the Grotto is submitted to the NSS.

History 
The New England Grotto was the first NSS Grotto. It was chartered in 1941 with Clay Perry as president and Ned Anderson as vice-president.

Grottos of the NSS 
Below are the Grottos of the NSS as listed in 2009.

Alabama 
Birmingham Grotto
Central Alabama Grotto
Cullman Grotto
Gadsden Grotto
Huntsville Grotto
Jackson County Grotto
Montgomery Grotto

Alaska 
Glacier Grotto

Arizona 
Central Arizona Grotto
Cochise County Cavers
Escabrosa Grotto
Mule Mountain Caving Club
Northern Arizona Grotto
Southern Arizona Grotto

Arkansas 
Boston Mountain Grotto
Central Region Arkansas Grotto
COBRA Grotto
 Little Rock Grotto
Middle Ozark Lower Earth Society MOLES

California 
Desert Dog Troglodytes
Diablo Grotto
Mother Lode Grotto
San Diego Grotto
San Francisco Bay Chapter of the NSS
San Joaquin Valley
Shascade Caving Society
Shasta Area Grotto
Southern California Grotto
Stanislaus Speleology Association
Waldo Brothers Grotto

Colorado 
Colorado Grotto
Colorado Western Slope Grotto
Front Range Grotto
Northern Colorado Grotto
Red Canyon Grotto
Southern Colorado Mountain
Timberline Grotto

Connecticut 
Central Connecticut Grotto

Delaware 
Commander Cody Caving Club

District of Columbia 
District of Columbia Grotto

Florida 
Central Florida Grotto
Flint River Grotto
Florida Speleological Society
Tampa Bay Area Grotto

Georgia 
Athens Speleological Society
Augusta Cave Masters
Clayton County Cavers
Clock Tower Grotto
Dogwood City Grotto
Middle Georgia Grotto
Pigeon Mountain Grotto

Hawaii 
Hawai'i Grotto

Idaho 
Bear River Grotto
Gem State Grotto
Silver Sage Grotto

Illinois 
Little Egypt Grotto
Near Normal Grotto
Rock River Speleological Society
Sub-Urban Chicago Grotto
Windy City Grotto

Indiana 
Bloomington Indian Grotto
Central Indiana Grotto
Eastern Indiana Grotto
Evansville Metropolitan Grotto
Harrison-Crawford Grotto
Northern Indiana Grotto
Saint Joseph Valley Grotto
Western Indiana Grotto

Iowa 
Iowa Grotto

Kansas 
Kansas Speleological Society

Kentucky 
Blue Grass Grotto
Fort Knox Grotto
Green River Grotto
Hart of Kentucky Grotto
Louisville Grotto
Pine Mountain Grotto
Rockcastle Regional Grotto

Louisiana 
Crescent City Cavers

Maine 
none based out of Maine

Maryland 
Baltimore Grotto
Frederick Grotto
Sligo Grotto
Western Maryland Grotto

Massachusetts 
Boston Grotto

Michigan 
Detroit Urban Grotto
Michigan Interlakes Grotto
Western Michigan Grotto

Minnesota 
Minnesota Speleological Society

Mississippi 
 JUST Cavers

Missouri 
Branson Area Tri-Lakes Grotto
Chouteau Grotto
Kansas City Area Grotto
Meramec Valley Grotto
Middle Mississippi Valley Grotto
Missouri Sch. Mines Spelunkers Club
Ozark Highlands Grotto
SEMO Grotto
Springfield Plateau Grotto
Stygian Grotto

Montana 
Northern Rocky Mountain Grotto

Nebraska 
none based out of Nebraska

Nevada 
Northern Nevada Grotto
Southern Nevada Grotto

New Hampshire 
none based out of New Hampshire

New Jersey 
Central New Jersey Grotto
New Jersey Tri-State Speleological Society
Northern New Jersey Grotto

New Mexico 
Guadalupe Grotto
Hondo Grotto
Mesilla Valley Grotto
New Mexico Tech Student Grotto
Parajito Grotto
Pecos Valley Grotto
Sandia Grotto
Sierra Blanca Grotto
Whites Sands Grotto

New York 
Helderberg-Hudson Grotto
Met Grotto
Niagara Frontier Grotto
Rensselaer Outing Club
Shawangunk-Catskill Area Grotto
Syracuse University Outing

North Carolina 
Bryson City Grotto
Flittermouse Grotto
Triangle Troglodytes

North Dakota 
none based out of North Dakota

Ohio 
Central Ohio Grotto
Cleveland Grotto
Dayton Underground Grotto
Greater Cincinnati Grotto
Miami Valley Grotto
Ohio Cavers and Climbers
Red-Eye Karst Team
Shady Grove Grotto
Standing Stone Grotto
Wittenberg University Speleological Society

Oklahoma 
Arbuckle Mountains Grotto
Central Oklahoma Grotto
Tulsa Regional OK Grotto

Oregon 
Oregon Grotto
Oregon High Desert Grotto
Willamette Valley Grotto

Pennsylvania 
Bald Eagle Grotto
Bucks County Grotto
Buffalo Valley Grotto
Cave Hill Grotto
Franklin County Grotto
Greater Allentown Grotto
Huntingdon County Cave Hunters
Loyalhanna Grotto
Nittany Grotto
Pennsylvania Inner-Earth Grotto
Philadelphia Grotto
Pittsburgh Grotto
Seven Valleys Grotto
York Grotto

Rhode Island 
none based out of Rhode Island

South Carolina 
South Carolina Interstate Grotto

South Dakota 
Paha Sapa Grotto

Tennessee 
Chattanooga Grotto
Clarksville Underground
Devilstep Grotto
East Tennessee Grotto
Mountain Empire Grotto
Nashville Grotto
Obey River Grotto
Sewanee Mountain Grotto
Six Ridges Grotto
Smoky Mountain Grotto
Southport Chronic Cavers
Spencer Mountain Grotto
Tennessee Central Basin Grotto
Upper Cumberland Grotto

Texas 
Aggie Speleological Society
Bexar Grotto
Cowtown Grotto
Dallas-Fort Worth Grotto
Galveston Grotto
Greater Houston Grotto
Lubbock Area Grotto
Permian Basin Speleological Society
UT Grotto

Utah 
Salt Lake Grotto
Timpanogos Grotto
Utah Grotto
Wasatch Grotto

Vermont 
Vermont Cavers Association

Virginia 
Battlefield Area Troglodyte Society
Blue Ridge Grotto
Charlottesville Grotto
Fairfax Underground Network
Front Royal Grotto
Grapevine Grotto
James River Grotto
Madison University Student Grotto
Mid-Virginia Underground Grotto
Mountain Empire Grotto
New River Valley Grotto
Richmond Area Speleological Society
Tidewater Grotto
Virginia Highlands Grotto
VPI Cave Club

Washington 
Cascade Grotto

West Virginia 
Charleston Grotto
ESSO Grotto
Germany Valley Grotto
Greater Randolph (GROSS)
Monongahela Grotto
Monroe County Cavers
Mountain State Grotto
Parkersburg Area Grotto
TRA Grotto
Tri-State Grotto
West Virginia University Student Grotto

Wisconsin 
Great Lakes Cavers
Wisconsin Speleological Society

Wyoming 
Armpit Grotto
Hole-in-the-Wall Grotto

International 
Anthros Costa Rica Grotto
Balincaguin Conservancy Grotto
PAAMUL - Gruta de

Traveling 
Gypsy Underground Grotto
Stonewall Cavers

References

External links 
 National Speleological Society
 NSS Internal Organizations

Caving organizations in the United States